The 1500s ran from January 1, 1500, to December 31, 1599.

References

Sources